Robert Barnett Evnen (born 1952) is an American attorney and Republican politician in the state of Nebraska. He is the 27th Secretary of State of Nebraska, serving since 2019.

Legal career
Evnen graduated from Michigan State University with a bachelor's degree in social science in 1974 and from the University of Southern California's Gould School of Law with a Juris Doctor in 1977. He was a partner at the Lincoln, Nebraska law firm Woods & Aitken, LLP for 32 years, where he practiced labor and employment law.  He is licensed to practice law in Nebraska, Iowa, and California (inactive).

Political career
Evnen served as a member of the State Board of Education, following his appointment by Governor Dave Heineman in 2005 and he was elected to a full term in 2008. He also served as general counsel to the Nebraska Republican Party and as campaign treasurer for U.S. Senator Deb Fischer.

In the 2018 elections, Evnen ran for Secretary of State of Nebraska. He won the election, defeating Spencer Danner, the Democratic Party nominee, and was sworn into office on January 10, 2019. Evnen supported Nebraska Attorney General Doug Peterson's decision to sign on to a lawsuit contesting the 2020 United States presidential election. Evnen's office later investigated allegations of voter fraud, saying that they "haven't found any validity or merit" to them.

Evnen ran for a second term in the 2022 election. He defeated two Republican opponents in the primary election, both of whom had endorsed President Donald Trump's false allegations of voter fraud in the 2020 presidential election, and won reelection without opposition from the Democratic Party.

References

External links

1952 births
Living people
Michigan State University alumni
Nebraska lawyers
Nebraska Republicans
Politicians from Lincoln, Nebraska
Politicians from Sioux City, Iowa
Political campaign staff
Secretaries of State of Nebraska
USC Gould School of Law alumni
21st-century American politicians